Bainbrigg is a surname. Notable people with the surname include:

Reginald Bainbrigg (1545–1606), English schoolmaster and antiquary
Thomas Bainbrigg (died 1646), English college head
Thomas Bainbrigg (controversialist) (1636–1703), English Protestant controversialist